The 1966–67 Taça de Portugal was the 27th edition of the Portuguese football knockout tournament, organized by the Portuguese Football Federation (FPF). The 1966–67 Taça de Portugal began on 30 October 1966. The final was played on 9 July 1967 at the Estádio Nacional.

Braga were the previous holders, having defeated Vitória de Setúbal 1–0 in the previous season's final. Defending champions Braga were unable to regain the Taça de Portugal as they were defeated by Académica de Coimbra in the semi-finals. Vitória de Setúbal claimed their second cup trophy by defeating Académica de Coimbra 3–2.

First round
All first round first leg ties were played on the 30 October, whilst the second legs were played between the 3–6 November. Cup ties which ended in a tied aggregate score were replayed at a later date. Teams from the Primeira Liga (I) and the Portuguese Second Division (II) entered at this stage.

|}

Second round
Ties were played between the 15–29 January. Due to the odd number of teams involved at this stage of the competition, Varzim qualified for the next round due to having no opponent to face at this stage of the competition.

|}

Third round
Ties were played between the 14–21 May. Due to the odd number of teams involved at this stage of the competition, Vitória de Setúbal qualified for the next round due to having no opponent to face at this stage of the competition. Angrense, Atlético Luanda, Marítimo and Ténis Bissau were invited to participate in the competition.

|}

Quarter-finals
Ties were played on the 11–18 June.

|}

Semi-finals
Ties were played between the 25–30 June and the 2 July.

|}

Final

References

Taça de Portugal seasons
1966–67 domestic association football cups
Taca